The General Aircraft GAL.33 Cagnet was a British light trainer aircraft designed by General Aircraft Ltd which flew from 1939 to 1941.  Only one example was constructed.

Design
The Cagnet was a two-seat pusher propeller aircraft.  The side-by-side seating was in an open cockpit just ahead of the strut-mounted inline engine.  The low cantilever wings featured a gull shape, with twin booms mounted, one at each wing's bend point.  A horizontal stabilizer and elevator ran between twin fins with rudders, one at the end of each boom.

The fixed landing gear used a nosewheel.  First flight was in 1939; the aircraft bore the serial number T46.

General Aircraft proposed the Cagnet as a basic trainer.  It was tested as a Flying Observation post trainer by the Royal School of Army Co-operation from February through June 1940 (with military serial number W7646).  After that testing, it underwent various other tests.  Its final flight was in 1941.

The engine was a  Blackburn Cirrus Minor, which gave a cruising speed of 100 mph (160 km/h).

Specifications (Cagnet)

References
General Aircraft Cagnet –  British Aircraft of World War II

1930s British military trainer aircraft
Cygnet
Single-engined pusher aircraft
Aircraft first flown in 1939